Songs to Learn & Sing is a compilation album by Echo & the Bunnymen which was released on 11 November 1985 and featured all of the singles the band had released up to that point. Released on LP, cassette and CD by Korova, WEA and Sire Records, the album received positive reviews and reached number six on the UK Albums Chart and number 158 on the US Billboard 200.

Releases
Songs to Learn & Sing was first released as an LP, a cassette and a CD by Korova in the United Kingdom, WEA in Germany and Sire Records in the United States on 15 November 1985. The LP and cassette versions of the album have six tracks on side one and five tracks on side two. The album was also available as a limited edition picture disc and a limited edition album with a copy of "The Pictures on My Wall" single. The album was reissued on 17 October 1990 by WEA.

The tracks included on the album are in chronological order and taken from the four studio albums that had been released up to that point as well including two non-album singles: "Rescue" from the Crocodiles album; "The Puppet", a non-album single; "Do It Clean", the B-side to "The Puppet"; "A Promise" from the Heaven Up Here album; "The Back of Love" and "The Cutter" from the Porcupine album; "Never Stop", a non-album single; "The Killing Moon", "Silver" and "Seven Seas" from the Ocean Rain album; and "Bring on the Dancing Horses" a new single.

Release history

Singles
Although the album is a compilation album it included one previously unreleased single — "Bring on the Dancing Horses" which was released on 14 November 1985. The single reached number 21 on the UK Singles Chart and number 15 on the Irish Singles Chart.

Reception
Allmusic rated the release four and a half stars out of five and describes the album as "a solid and comprehensive collection of the band's material". The album was listed in Rock Compact Disc magazine's list of 45 classic "British Indie Guitar Rock" albums. The album was also reasonably successful with the fans which was shown by the album reaching number 6 on the UK Albums Chart.

Chart positions

Track listing
Note: track timings taken from original LP's labels.

Personnel

Musicians
Ian McCulloch – vocals
Will Sergeant – guitar
Les Pattinson – bass
Pete de Freitas – drums

Production
Ian Broudie – producer ("Rescue", "The Back of Love", "The Cutter")
Bill Drummond – producer ("The Puppet", "Do It Clean")
David Balfe – producer ("The Puppet", "Do It Clean")
Hugh Jones – producer ("A Promise", "Never Stop")
The Bunnymen – producer ("A Promise", "The Killing Moon", "Silver", "Seven Seas")
Laurie Latham – producer ("Bring on the Dancing Horses")
Anton Corbijn – photography

References

External links
 The official Echo and The Bunnymen website

1985 greatest hits albums
Albums produced by Laurie Latham
Echo & the Bunnymen compilation albums
Sire Records compilation albums